ThorSport Racing is an American professional stock car racing team that currently competes in the NASCAR Craftsman Truck Series. The team was founded in 1996 as SealMaster Racing and is based in Sandusky, Ohio. Owned by Duke Thorson and his wife Rhonda, it currently fields four full-time teams: the No. 13 for Hailie Deegan, the No. 66 part time for Conner Jones, the No. 88 for Matt Crafton, the No. 98 for Ty Majeski, and the No. 99 for Ben Rhodes. The team has won three Truck Series championships (2013, 2014, 2019) with Crafton, and one championship with Rhodes (2021). The team is also the longest continually tenured team in the truck series, having fielded at least one truck in every season since 1996.

Nationwide Series

Car No. 13 history
In 2008, ThorSport Racing made their Nationwide Series debut with Shelby Howard driving the No. 13 Chevrolet Monte Carlo for 2 races starting at Lucas Oil Park and Bristol. He then finished 20th and 23rd both of the races.

Camping World Truck Series

Truck No. 8 history
In 1998, ThorSport Racing, at the time SealMaster Racing, fielded the No. 8 truck at Mesa Marin for Jerry Cook. Cook started 34th before retiring from the race and finishing 32nd.

The No. 8 was once again fielded by the team in 1999 at Phoenix for Joe Ruttman.

Truck No. 13 history

Multiple Drivers (2004-2005)
The No. 13 truck began racing in 2004, with Tina Gordon driving with sponsorship from Vassarette and Microtel. After five races, she left the team due to injuries she suffered at Atlanta, and Lance Hooper and Paul White shared the ride for the next several races. After several lackluster results, Jimmy Spencer drove at Loudon, finishing eighteenth, before Jason Small and Andy Houston finished out the season in the truck. For 2005, Tracy Hines drove the truck and had a fifth-place finish at Richmond International Raceway with sponsorship from David Zoriki Motorsports. He was released with two races to go, and Chad Chaffin and Johnny Sauter filled out the schedule in his place.

Kerry Earnhardt (2006)
Kerry Earnhardt drove for ThorSport Racing during the 2006 season, his best finish being 11th which he recorded twice, at Nashville and Las Vegas.

Willie Allen (2007)
Earnhardt not retained for 2007 and rookie Willie Allen was signed to replace him. He had two top-tens and won Rookie of the Year, but was replaced at the end of the year by USAR Hooters Pro Cup driver Shelby Howard. 

Shelby Howard (2008)
Shelby Howard had two top-tens as well in the BobCat Company/FarmPaint.com Chevy, but finished seventeenth in points, and was released. 

Johnny Sauter (2009-2012)
Johnny Sauter returned to the team for the 2009 season full-time with sponsorship from Fun Sand. The team now runs through a partnership with Mike Curb. Sauter took ThorSport's third win as a team at Las Vegas Motor Speedway, and gave ThorSport its first-ever 1–2 finish, with Crafton in second. Sauter would finish 6th in points at the end of the year.  In 2010, Sauter took home his second win at Kansas after late contact with Ron Hornaday. Sauter would eventually finish 3rd in points to Todd Bodine. For 2011 the team gained sponsorship from Safe Auto Insurance Company. Sauter would score wins at Martinsville and Homestead, finishing second in points to Austin Dillon. Safe Auto left the team, being replaced by The Peanut Roaster in 2012. Sauter's season was beset by bad luck, but improved performance late in the season, as well as sweeping the races at Texas, lifted Sauter to 9th in points. 

Part Time (2013)
Todd Bodine took over as the driver for the 2013 season placing 11th at Daytona International Speedway, with Mattei Air Compressors as the truck's new primary sponsor. However, the team was unable to find additional sponsorship and was forced to release Bodine after the seventh race, with Brett Moffitt, Frank Kimmel and Tracy Hines each running a race before the team shut down.  Kimmel returned to the No. 13 at the season-ending race at Homestead-Miami Speedway.

Jeb Burton (2014)
In 2014, Jeb Burton was hired to drive the No. 13.  Initially running on a race-by-race basis pending sponsorship, Burton's ride was upgraded to the full season when Estes Express Lines signed a deal with the team.  However, the deal would not be extended to 2015, causing the team to release Burton, who subsequently signed with BK Racing in the Sprint Cup Series.  

Cameron Hayley (2015-2016)
Meanwhile, the No. 13 was taken over by Cameron Hayley, with Cabinets by Hayley signing to sponsor the ride. Hayley returned to the ride in 2016. Hayley would have a dismal season, with not making it to the Chase and worse point standings finish than last year. 

Cody Coughlin (2017)
Hayley did not return for 2017. He would be replaced by Cody Coughlin for 2017. Coughlin finished 14th in points, which lead to him being released after the 2017 season. 

Myatt Snider (2018)
Coughlin was released and replaced by Myatt Snider for the 2018 season. Snider would go on to record 3 top 5s and 8 top 10s which would be good enough for a 9th-place points finish for the rookie driver.

Johnny Sauter (2019-2021)
Only a few days before the truck series season opener at Daytona, it was announced that Johnny Sauter would once again make a return to the team for the 2019 season. At Iowa, Sauter was parked by NASCAR for wrecking Austin Hill during the caution lap. As a result of the incident, he was suspended for the following week's race at Gateway. Snider was announced to substitute for Sauter at Gateway. Sauter was eliminated from the playoffs at Las Vegas when he finished 29th after experiencing an engine failure that also plagued three other trucks. Ilmor, the manufacturer of the engines, took responsibility for the NT1 engines that suffered from severe detonation due to the combination of the high engine load condition combined with the extreme weather conditions in Las Vegas. Despite Ilmor's announcement, NASCAR denied ThorSport's request to reinstate Sauter and Grant Enfinger into the playoffs.

On February 21, 2020, the No. 13 team was docked 10 owner and driver points before the Las Vegas race after an illegal engine oil reservoir tank was discovered during pre-race inspection. Despite this, Sauter finished 2nd to Kyle Busch. However, it was the team's best finish of the season. Sauter missed the Playoffs for the first time in his career and finished 13th in the final standings.
In 2021, Sauter picked up his first top 5 finish in 20 races at the Fr8Auctions 200. 

Part Time (2022)
The 13 would be reduced to only 4 races with Sauter in 2022 as Thorsport would open a brand new 4th team. Sauter would really impress, almost winning at Martinsville Speedway and getting another top 5 at Gateway.

Hailie Deegan (2023-Present)
On December 15, 2022, Thorsport announced that Hailie Deegan will drive the No. 13 (which was renumbered from the No. 98) full time in 2023, the No. 98 team will move over to the No. 13 team.

Truck No. 13 Results

Truck No. 22 history
Part Time (2002)
In 2001, Lance Hooper drove a second ThorSport truck at Milwaukee, the No. 22.

Truck No. 27 history
Ben Rhodes (2017)
In 2017, it was announced that Ben Rhodes would move from the 41 to the 27 to run full-time with a full-season sponsor in Safelite AutoGlass. He held off Truck Series champion Christopher Bell to win his first race at Las Vegas and finished 5th in the point standings. For 2018, Rhodes moved back into the 41.

Part-time (2018-2019)
On July 16, 2018 Chase Briscoe joined forces with ThorSport Racing and won the 2018 Eldora Dirt Derby in his first race in a NASCAR truck since 2017.

For the 2019 NextEra Energy 250, Myatt Snider drove the No. 27 Ford F-150 at Daytona and Martinsville.

Chase Briscoe returned to the No. 27 for the 2019 Eldora Dirt Derby. After leading the majority of the race and winning the first two stages, a late crash lead to a seventh-place finish.

Truck No. 66 history
Part-time (2021)
In 2021, Ty Majeski was scheduled to drive at Charlotte Motor Speedway and Nashville Superspeedway in the No. 66 truck. Later, retired driver Paul Menard would return to the series by driving at Circuit of the Americas. Majeski would drive an additional race at Pocono Raceway. Paul Menard returned to compete at Watkins Glen.

Ty Majeski (2022)
It was announced that Ty Majeski would drive the No. 66 full time in the 2022. He made the playoffs by staying consistent with seven top-fives and ten top-10 finishes. During the playoffs, Majeski won at Bristol and Homestead to lock himself in the Championship 4. Majeski finished 20th at Phoenix after a late spin, resulting in a fourth place finish in the standings.

Part Time (2023-Present)
With Ty Majeski moving to the No. 98 entry, the No. 66 was reduced to a part time entry with Conner Jones at the wheel for 9 races.

Truck No. 66 Results

Truck No. 87 history
Part-time (2006)
In 2006, ThorSport fielded the No. 87 truck for driver Willie Allen.

Truck No. 88 history

Part-time (1996-1997)
The No. 88 truck was the first out of the ThorSport stable. Debuting in the 1996 season at the Milwaukee Mile, Terry Cook finished 12th in the race for the team, which was then known as Sealmaster Racing. He ran two additional races in the truck that season but did not finish better than 21st. Cook drove a limited schedule with the team in 1997 in the PBA Tour Chevy. Despite not finishing in the top-ten, Cook won his first career pole at Flemington Speedway, and finished 24th in the final standings. 

Terry Cook (1999-2000)
The team received enough funding to compete full-time in 1998, and Cook won his first career race at Flemington, but only improved to a twentieth-place points finish. ThorSport began the 1999 season without primary sponsorship before Big Daddy's BBQ Sauce joined the operation late in the season, allowing Cook to finish 15th in points. In 2000, PickupTruck.com became the team's new sponsor, and Cook had a total of eight top-ten finishes but was replaced in the final event of the season by Matt Crafton, who finished ninth. 

Matt Crafton (2001-2003) 
Fast Master Driveway Sealer and XE Sighting System shared sponsorship duties for Crafton, who drove for the team full time in 2002, picking up eleven top-tens and finishing 12th in points in his rookie season. Despite Menards becoming a full-time sponsor in 2002, Crafton only had six top-tens and dropped to fifteenth in the standings, but he improved to eleventh the following year. For the 2003 season finale at Homestead-Miami Speedway, Buddy Rice was placed in the No. 88 truck, finishing 20th, while Crafton moved to the No. 98.

Tracy Hines (2004)
In 2004, rookie Tracy Hines became the team's new driver, and he posted three top-ten finishes and finished eighteenth in points. 

Matt Crafton (2005-present)
Crafton returned to the 88 for 2005, winning his first career pole at New Hampshire International Speedway and finishing ninth in points, a team-best. He slipped to fourteenth in points in 2006 despite ten top-tens, and repeated his top-ten total in 2007, moving up to eighth in points. 2008 was the team's best year to that point, with Crafton scoring his first win at Charlotte and finishing fifth in points. Despite not winning the next year, the No. 88 team finished runner-up in points to Ron Hornaday Jr.

Crafton had another strong season in 2010, earning one pole at Texas Motor Speedway, 10 top-five, and 20 top-10 finishes, resulting in a season-ending rank of fourth.

2011 saw the second win of Crafton's career at Iowa Speedway, in addition to poles at Michigan International Speedway and Martinsville Speedway, where he broke the track qualifying record. However, four DNFs (Did Not Finish) due to engine failures, mechanical issues and accidents caused by other competitors led to only five top fives and 13 top 10s, ultimately relegating Crafton to eighth in the final standings. In 2012, he had a decent season, finishing 6th in points.

2013 was Crafton's best season in his career to date. He won his third career race at Kansas in April. After this win, Crafton picked up the points lead and held it for the rest of the season.  He finished in the top ten in the first sixteen races of the season, and 19 overall, with a worst finish of 21st in the season finale at Homestead. He clinched his first Truck Series championship with his start in that race, and was able to stay on the lead lap despite late crash damage to become the first driver to complete every lap of the season in the Truck Series.

On March 30, 2014, Crafton scored his fourth career Truck win at Martinsville.  On June 6, he won on fuel strategy at Texas Motor Speedway to win two races in a season for the first time in his career.  It was also the first time he led more than 100 laps in a race.  Despite crashing out at Dover and Gateway, his first DNFs in over two years, and dropping to 17 top tens, Crafton would ultimately go on to become the first back-to-back champion in the Truck Series.

Crafton would score his sixth career victory on February 28, 2015, in the Hyundai Construction Equipment 200, the revived Atlanta race.  In May, he played fuel strategy to the win at Kansas, winning a second race at one track for the first time in his career.  This also marked the first repeat win by any driver in the Truck Series at Kansas. In June, Crafton won at Texas to defend his victory from the previous season, another career first.  In July, he picked up his fourth win of the season at Kentucky after the race was cut short due to Ben Kennedy's crash into the catch fence. He scored two additional wins at Martinsville and the season finale at Homestead but finished third in the points due to a few crashes.

Crafton went on to conclude 2016 & 2017 with runner-up and fourth-place showings in the final point standings respectively under the new "Playoffs" system.

Crafton finished 6th in the 2018 standings despite being winless for the first time since 2012.

Despite also concluding 2019 without winning a race, Crafton made his third-ever Championship 4 appearance and beat out Ross Chastain by two spots to claim his third career Truck Series Championship.

On February 21, 2020, the No. 88 team was docked 10 owner and driver points before the Las Vegas race after an illegal engine oil reservoir tank was discovered during pre-race inspection. That season, Crafton broke his winless streak by winning at Kansas and had runner-up finishes at Dover and Richmond, putting him 5th in the final point standings.

In 2021, Crafton did not win a race. Despite this, he made the Championship 4, finished 12th at Phoenix, and 4th in the final standings.

Truck No. 88 Results

 Season still in progress
 Ineligible for series points

Truck No. 89 history
Part-time (2017)
This truck entered in the 2017 Eldora Dirt Derby, with Rico Abreu driving.

Truck No. 98 history

Part-time (2002-2003, 2009-2012)
ThorSport first fielded the 98 truck at the 2002 Chevy Silverado 150 for Cory Kruseman with Agromin sponsoring. He finished 31st after suffering engine failure. The next race came a year later at the season-ending Ford 200 with Crafton driving, with sponsorship from Enzyme Magic as a sister truck to the 88 that he normally drove, finishing fifteenth. The 98 did not appear for six years until the 2009 Heluva Good! 200 at New Hampshire with Michael McDowell driving. He finished fourteenth in the Perkins Police truck. It ran another race later in the season at Texas with David Gilliland, but finished 35th after suffering rear-end problems early into the race.

In 2010, the 98 ran at Daytona with Landon Cassill and EasytoInstall.com, but wrecked early in the race. The 98 returned in 2011 with Penske development driver Dakoda Armstrong behind the wheel with sponsorship from Ferrellgas and Argisure for 7 races. Armstrong later joined ThorSport for the 2012 season to make a run at Rookie of the Year. However, the team's EverFi sponsorship would only last for the first 14 races, forcing the team to release Armstrong before the fall race at Iowa and shut the team down.

Johnny Sauter (2013-2015)
The 98 returned for 2013 with Johnny Sauter swapping numbers. The team took back-to-back wins at Daytona and Martinsville but suffered a setback when crew chief Joe Shear Jr. was handed a suspension from NASCAR due to a fuel cell issue. Despite Shear's return at Iowa, he would later resign from ThorSport after the Eldora race, citing disagreements over the team being based in Ohio rather than North Carolina.  Sauter would nonetheless win his third race of 2013 at Talladega, sweeping the restrictor plate events in the Truck Series.  He would finish fourth in final points. Sauter returned to the 98 in 2014. He dropped to just one win, at Michigan, but was a championship contender throughout much of the season before fading back to equal his fourth-place points finish from 2013.  Sauter ran the Truck again in 2015, but announced late in the season that he would be leaving for GMS Racing in 2016. 

Rico Abreu (2016)
Rico Abreu would replace Sauter in the 2016 season. Abreu posted 2 Top 5s and 5 Top 10s and finished 13th in points. 

Grant Enfinger (2017-2020)
Abreu lost his ride after the 2016 season due to a lack of sponsorship. He would be replaced by Grant Enfinger for 2017. Enfinger missed the playoffs and finished 11th in points. 2018 saw a more successful year for Enfinger, as he made the playoffs with his strength throughout the regular season and won the fall Las Vegas race, advancing to the Round of 6. He missed the Championship 4 but finished 5th in points.

On February 21, 2020, the No. 98 team was docked 10 owner and driver points before the Las Vegas race after an illegal engine oil reservoir tank was discovered during pre-race inspection. On September 10, Enfinger won at Richmond Raceway and teammates Ben Rhodes and Matt Crafton completed the top three finishers; it was the first 1-2-3 finish in the history of the NASCAR Trucks Series

Grant Enfinger & Christian Eckes (2021)
In 2021, it was announced Enfinger and Christian Eckes would split the schedule in the #98, with Enfinger driving the races he didn’t have scheduled in the 98 for CR7 Motorsports. Eckes won at the Las Vegas night race. 

Christian Eckes (2022)
Eckes would drive the truck full-time in 2022. In 2022, Eckes would run up front at numerous races and made the playoffs despite not having a win. At the Round of 8 cutoff in Homestead-Miami, Eckes would miss making the Championship 4 by 7 points to teammate Ben Rhodes. Eckes left the team following the 2022 season to drive for McAnally-Hilgemann Racing. The No. 98 team was renumbered to the No. 13 for 2023.

Ty Majeski (2023-Present)
Thorsport Racing during the off season quietly swapped numbers for Ty Majeski's team from the No. 66 to the No. 98, as to keep number patterns with the team (13, 88, 98, 99).

Truck No. 99 history

On December 15, 2015, Ben Rhodes joined the team in a new fourth truck with sponsorship from Alpha Energy Solutions, the truck being numbered 41. He recorded two top-fives and five top-tens. He had a shot to win at Kansas Speedway until he tangled with Johnny Sauter on the last lap, leading to a William Byron win.

Rhodes returned in 2017 to the renumbered 27 truck. Rhodes won his first Truck race at Las Vegas holding off Christopher Bell.

The truck returned to using the 41 for 2018, scoring a win at Kentucky Speedway in the summer.

The truck would once again be renumbered for the 2019 season with the number 99. Rhodes won the Trucks' return to Darlington in 2020.

In 2021, Rhodes won the first two races of the season at Daytona and the Daytona Road Course, then finished the season off by winning the Truck Series championship.

In 2022, Rhodes finished second at Daytona. He DNF'd at 31st place at Las Vegas, but made up for the loss with three consecutive top-five finishes before winning at the Bristol dirt race. Rhodes finished second at Phoenix and second in the standings.

Truck No. 99 Results

 Season still in progress

ARCA Racing Series

Car No. 13 history
In 2014, Jeb Burton made his debut with ThorSport Racing after being released from Turner Scott Motorsports due to sponsorship, driving the No. 13 Toyota Camry at the season opener at Daytona in the ARCA Racing Series. Burton started 21st and finished 29th after being involved in the early crash.

Car No. 44 history

In 2012, nine-time ARCA Racing Series champion Frank Kimmel joined the team in the No. 44 Toyota Camry. In 2013, Kimmel became the leader in all-time wins in ARCA history with 80, en route to his tenth championship. The team shut down after Kimmel left the team for Win-Tron Racing following the championship-winning season.

Car No. 88 history
ThorSport fielded the No. 88 Toyota Camry for Matt Crafton in 2012 at Lucas Oil Raceway where he started on the pole but finished 31st after being involved in a crash. Previously, Crafton had ran a number of races for Kimmel Racing in the No. 88.

See also
Baker Curb Racing
Curb Agajanian Performance Group

References

External links

 
 
 

1996 establishments in Ohio
American auto racing teams
Companies based in Ohio
NASCAR teams
ARCA Menards Series teams